Condylorrhiza epicapna is a moth in the family Crambidae. It was described by Edward Meyrick in 1933. It is found in the former West Kasai and Orientale provinces of the Democratic Republic of the Congo.

References

Moths described in 1933
Spilomelinae